"Heartbeat City" is a song by American rock band the Cars from their fifth studio album of the same name (1984). It was released in September 1985 as the album's sixth and final single.

Background
Original US pressings of the LP and cassette versions listed the title of "Heartbeat City" as "Jacki".

"Heartbeat City" was one of the four songs performed by the Cars during their performance on Live Aid in 1985, along with "You Might Think", "Drive", and "Just What I Needed".

Release
"Heartbeat City" was released internationally as the sixth and final single the Heartbeat City album, where it was backed with "Why Can't I Have You". The song charted at number 78 in the United Kingdom and number 75 in Australia. Prior to its single release, "Heartbeat City" appeared as the B-side to "You Might Think" in the United States and "Why Can't I Have You" in the United Kingdom.

Reception
"Heartbeat City" has been described retrospectively as "ethereal" and as a "highlight" from Heartbeat City by AllMusic critic Greg Prato. Donald A. Guarisco, also of AllMusic, characterized the track as "a memorable effort in [the] vein [of 'atmospheric moodpieces'], a hypnotic bit of new wave that mixed impressionistic lyrics with an entrancing electronic soundscape." He concluded, "The result was probably a little too esoteric to be a hit but it got some exposure as the B-side to 'You Might Think' and provide a fittingly arty finale for the Heartbeat City album."

Charts

References

1984 songs
1985 singles
The Cars songs
Elektra Records singles
Song recordings produced by Ric Ocasek
Song recordings produced by Robert John "Mutt" Lange
Songs written by Ric Ocasek